Towcester Greyhound Stadium is a greyhound racing track located within Towcester Racecourse at Towcester in Northamptonshire, England. It has been the home of the English Greyhound Derby since 2021, having previously hosted the event from 2017 to 2018.

Opening
Towcester opened on 6 December 2014 becoming the first track in Britain to open since the 1995 openings of Harlow and Sittingbourne. The idea of a track inside the horse racing course was created by Lord Hesketh the racecourse owner and Chief Executive Kevin Ackerman. Former Walthamstow Racing Manager Chris Page, Deputy Racing Manager Andy Lisemore and Steve Cale were recruited to run the operation.

Construction
At a cost of £1.5 million the 420 metres circumference circuit was created by laying down 60,000 tonnes of soil so that the greyhound racing surface met the horse racing home straight at a level setting, resulting in a six-metre rise. The bends are very wide which assists the occasional eight dog race. The kennels were constructed inside unused horse stables and new trainers included five times champion trainer Mark Wallis, 2011 champion trainer Chris Allsopp, Kevin Hutton and Matt Dartnall. The distances are 260, 480, 500, 655, 686 and 906 metres and the first race was won by 4-1 shot Fairest Royal trained by Wallis.  A big screen situated on the home straight was a new feature to greyhound tracks.

Achievements
 Trainer Kevin Hutton won the prestigious Trainers Championship in March 2015.  
 Hutton twice retained the title in 2016 and 2017, joining a select group of trainers to win more than one title. 
 The track was crowned the BAGS National Champions at Perry Barr Stadium in December 2015 (team manager - Andy Lisemore). 
 Retained the BAGS National Championship in December 2016 (team manager - Simon Pearson).
 Awarded the Greyhound Derby after the closure of Wimbledon Stadium.
 Awarded the Puppy Derby in 2017 following the closure of Wimbledon Stadium.
 Kevin Hutton won the 2018 English Greyhound Derby
In 2018 the track gained another original classic race, the Oaks, from the Greyhound Racing Association (GRA).
 In 2018 the stadium signed a deal with ARC to race every Saturday morning and Sunday evening.
 In 2021, Thorn Falcon won the Derby for Belgian born Patrick Janssens

2018 administration 
In August 2018 the future of Towcester racecourse was put in doubt. A statement released by the racecourse on 16 August read: "Towcester Racecourse Company Limited, proprietors of Towcester Racecourse, are currently experiencing trading difficulties and are in discussions with key stakeholders and professional advisers on the way forward. However, the directors have concluded that they have no alternative in the short term but to seek court protection and are now taking steps to place the company into administration. As a result, the last greyhound meeting was on 12 August.

On 23 August KPMG were appointed as administrators and 134 out of 137 members of staff at the racecourse were made redundant. Eight trainers joined Henlow, including Mark Wallis and Nick Savva while Kevin Hutton joined Monmore.

On 13 November it was announced by the administrators that the racecourse's assets were being sold to a company called Fermor Land LLP.   This company was formed on 18 October (26 days before the sale) and is headed by Lord Hesketh's brother-in-law Mark Westropp, a trustee of the Hesketh Family trusts.

Re-opening
In October 2019 Kevin Boothby, promoter of Henlow Stadium, signed a deal for a 10-year lease at Towcester, with the intention that greyhound racing would re-start in March 2020. The stadium's re-opening was delayed by the COVID-19 pandemic before eventually opening on 22 May 2020. Several major competitions returned to the track including the English Greyhound Derby, Puppy Derby and Juvenile.

Competitions
The English Greyhound Derby
Champion Hurdle
The English Greyhound Derby Invitation
The Puppy Derby
The Oaks
Juvenile

Track records

(new track 2020 onwards)

Former (2020 onwards)

(2014-2018)

References

Sports venues in Northamptonshire
2014 establishments in England
Sports venues completed in 2014
Greyhound racing venues in the United Kingdom